Hajji Malek (also Romanized as Ḩājjī Malek; also known as Malek Moḩammad) is a village in Jahanabad Rural District, in the Central District of Hirmand County, Sistan and Baluchestan Province, Iran. At the 2006 census, its population was 294, in 56 families.

References 

Populated places in Hirmand County